Muldowney is an Irish surname. Notable people with the surname include:

 Aly Muldowney (born 1983), English rugby player
 Brendan Muldowney, graduate of Dun Laoghaire Institute of Art and Design, Ireland (The National Film School)
 Dominic Muldowney (born 1952), British composer
 Luke Muldowney (born 1986), English footballer
 Michael Joseph Muldowney (1889–1947), Republican member of the U.S. House of Representatives from Pennsylvania
 Shirley Muldowney (born 1940), pioneer in professional auto racing
 Suzanne Muldowney (born 1952), performance artist best known for her appearances on The Howard Stern Show
 Sylvester Muldowney (1908–1995), Irish hurler
 Therese Muldowney (born 1987), camogie player and social worker, who played in the 2009 All Ireland camogie final